Jim Cullen is a Canadian para-alpine skier. He represented Canada at the 1980 Winter Paralympics in Geilo, Norway.

He competed in the Men's Giant Slalom 1A and Men's Slalom 1A events and he won the silver medal at the latter event.

See also 
 List of Paralympic medalists in alpine skiing

References 

Living people
Year of birth missing (living people)
Place of birth missing (living people)
Paralympic alpine skiers of Canada
Alpine skiers at the 1980 Winter Paralympics
Medalists at the 1980 Winter Paralympics
Paralympic silver medalists for Canada
Paralympic medalists in alpine skiing